The canton of La Capelle is a former administrative division in northern France. It was disbanded following the French canton reorganisation which came into effect in March 2015. It had 8,128 inhabitants (2012).

The canton comprised the following communes:

Buironfosse
La Capelle
Chigny
Clairfontaine
Crupilly
Englancourt
Erloy
Étréaupont
La Flamengrie
Fontenelle
Froidestrées
Gergny
Lerzy
Luzoir
Papleux
Rocquigny
Sommeron
Sorbais

See also
List of cantons of France

References

Capelle
2015 disestablishments in France
States and territories disestablished in 2015